Dr. Charles John King-Turner (3 December 1904 – 4 April 1972) was an English cricketer.  King-Turner was a right-handed batsman.  He was born at Cirencester, Gloucestershire.

Educated at Cheltenham College, where he played for the Cheltenham XI, King-Turner made his first-class debut for Gloucestershire against Essex in the 1922 County Championship.  He played 5 further first-class fixtures in that season, playing his final first-class fixture against Leicestershire at Greenbank, Bristol. King-Turner was an inconsistent, scoring just 29 runs in his 6 matches at a batting average of 3.22 and a high score of 10.

In 1927, King-Turner is mentioned in The London Gazette in March 1927 as a University Candidate for the rank of 2nd Lieutenant in the Officers' Training Corps. He died in Cirencester on 4 April 1972.

References

External links
Charles King-Turner at Cricinfo
Charles King-Turner at CricketArchive

1904 births
1972 deaths
People from Cirencester
People educated at Cheltenham College
English cricketers
Gloucestershire cricketers
Officers' Training Corps officers
Sportspeople from Gloucestershire